Myles Kennedy is an American guitarist, singer and songwriter. Born in Boston, Massachusetts, he originally began his musical career in Spokane, Washington as the guitarist in jazz band Cosmic Dust. He formed alternative rock band Citizen Swing in 1992, which released two albums before breaking up in 1996. Kennedy and Citizen Swing rhythm guitarist Craig Johnson moved onto The Mayfield Four in 1996, which released two albums during its six-year tenure. Since early 2004, Kennedy's primary band has been Alter Bridge, which he founded with former Creed guitarist Mark Tremonti, bassist Brian Marshall and drummer Scott Phillips.

Outside of his bands, Kennedy has recorded with a range of artists including Big Wreck on "Breakthrough" in 2001, Fozzy on "Nameless Faceless" in 2005, and Sevendust on "Sorrow" in 2008. In 2009, he recorded vocals for two songs on the eponymous debut solo album by former Guns N' Roses and Velvet Revolver guitarist Slash, "Back from Cali" and "Starlight", released the following year. He was later selected by Slash as the vocalist for his solo touring band. Slash and Kennedy, along with The Conspirators (Todd Kerns and Brent Fitz), released Apocalyptic Love in 2012, which was written by the pair. The following year, they collaborated on the title track for the Slash-produced film Nothing Left to Fear, and in 2014 the collective released its second album World on Fire, which was again written by Slash and Kennedy.

Kennedy continued to collaborate with other artists, featuring on the 2013 "guest version" of "Here's to Us" by Halestorm alongside Slash, Shinedown's Brent Smith, Sixx:A.M.'s James Michael, Theory of a Deadman's Tyler Connolly, Disturbed's David Draiman and In This Moment's Maria Brink. Also in 2013, he collaborated with Gov't Mule on "Done Got Wise", and in 2016 he recorded "Downfall" with Italian gothic metal band Lacuna Coil. In 2018, Kennedy released his debut solo album Year of the Tiger, which was written entirely by the vocalist. The third album by Slash, Kennedy and the Conspirators, Living the Dream, followed later in the year.

Songs

See also
Myles Kennedy discography

References

External links
List of Myles Kennedy songs at AllMusic

Kennedy, Myles